Abraham (Avi) Ahron Bluth (born 1974) is an Israeli brigadier general (Tat-Aluf) who currently commands the Judea and Samaria Division

Previously he commanded the 89th Commando Brigade, the Judea Regional Brigade and the 101st Paratrooper battalion.

Biography and military service
Bluth was born in Jerusalem to Efraim and Shoshana. hhe lived in the West Bank settlement of Neve Tzuf. He was drafted into the IDF in 1993. He volunteered as a paratrooper in the Paratroopers Brigade, and in 1995 became an infantry officer after completing Officer Candidate School. Bluth served as a platoon leader at the 890 paratroop battalion and fought in South Lebanon. Later on he commanded the 101st "Peten" paratrooper battalion during Operation Cast Lead  in which he was injured. Afterwards he commanded Maglan Unit. His next position was as the commander of the Judea Regional Brigade. Later on he commanded a reserve Paratroopers Brigade. In 2017 he was appointed as the commander of the 89th Commando Brigade and in 2018 he was chosen to be appointed to be the next Military Secretary to the Prime Minister.While serving as the Military Secretary to the Prime Minister, on January 4, 2019, he was reprimanded by the Chief of Staff, Gadi Eisenkot, for not delivering on time the Prime Minister's directive to delay the evacuation of Amona. in 2021 he was appointed commander of the Judea and Samaria Division

Awards and decorations 
Avi Bluth was awarded three campaign ribbons for his service during three conflicts.

Personal life 
Bluth is married and has 6 children, he resides with his family in the Moshav Nehusha.He has a bachelor's degree in philosophy, economics and political science from the Hebrew University of Jerusalem, and a master's degree in strategic thinking from the United States Army War College in Pennsylvania.

References

1974 births
Living people
Israeli Jews
Israeli military personnel